Gérard Abiton (born 1954) is a French classical guitarist. At 16 years old, Gerard Abiton joined the Conservatoire de Paris (cnsmdp) in Alexandre Lagoya's class.

References

External links 
 Gérard Abiton's Official website
 Gérard Abiton (AllMusic)
 Gérard Abiton 's discography (Discogs)
 Scarlatti Domenico - Sonata K466 - Gérard Abiton, guitar (YouTube)

1954 births
Living people
Conservatoire de Paris alumni
French classical guitarists
French male guitarists
20th-century French musicians
21st-century French musicians
20th-century French male musicians
21st-century French male musicians